Shinkan may refer to:
Shinkan (official), a former type of government official in Japan who worked at a Shinto shrine
Shinkan (1001–1050), Japanese Buddhist monk and son of Emperor Kazan

See also

Shinkansen, a network of high-speed railway lines in Japan
Shinken, a Japanese practice sword with a sharpened blade
Shunkan, Japanese monk
Xingan County, Jiangxi Province, China